John Edward Holbrook (born 14 June 1962) is a Church of England bishop. He is the Bishop of Brixworth in the Diocese of Peterborough. He also is currently serving as acting diocesan Bishop of Peterborough. He had been Rural Dean of Wimborne in the Diocese of Salisbury and served as Acting Bishop of Leicester (of the Diocese of Leicester).

Education and ministry
Holbrook grew up in Bristol where he was educated at the Bristol Cathedral Choir School. As an undergraduate he studied theology at St Peter's College, Oxford, where he obtained his MA (Oxbridge MA after a BA(Hons)).

Holbrook attended theological college at Ridley Hall, Cambridge and was made a deacon at Petertide 1986 (29 June) and ordained priest the Petertide following (5 July 1987), both times by Ronnie Bowlby, Bishop of Southwark, at Southwark Cathedral. His first ordained ministry position was as a curate at St Mary the Virgin, Barnes, London. In 1989, he moved to St Mary's Church, Bletchley as senior curate and curate-in-charge of Whaddon Way Ecumenical Church (an Anglican-Baptist local ecumenical partnership (LEP). In 1993 he became the Vicar of Adderbury with Milton and, from 2000, also the Rural Dean of Deddington.

From 2002 until 2011, Holbrook was Rector of Wimborne Minster and priest-in-charge of Witchampton, Stanbridge and Long Crichel. He also became chaplain of the South and East Dorset Primary Care Trust and, in 2004, the Rural Dean of Wimborne. From 2006, he was also an honorary canon and prebendary of Salisbury Cathedral as well as priest-in-charge of Horton, Chalbury, Hinton Martel and Holt Saint James.

Bishop
On 4 March 2011, 10 Downing Street announced Holbrook as the Bishop-designate of Brixworth in the Diocese of Peterborough, in succession to Frank White. He was consecrated as a bishop at Westminster Abbey on 2 June 2011 by Rowan Williams, Archbishop of Canterbury, and installed at Peterborough Cathedral on 29 June. He shares overall responsibility with the Bishop of Peterborough, the diocesan bishop, for the whole diocese.

On 15 May 2015 it was announced that, from 1 September, Holbrook would be part-time acting Bishop of Leicester (during a vacancy in that See), retaining his post and duties in Peterborough. He served until Martyn Snow took up his post as Bishop of Leicester.

Marriage and family
Holbrook is married to Elizabeth, whom he met while studying at Oxford University; she is a tax accountant. The couple have one son and one daughter, Thomas and Anna. Thomas is a graduate of Computer Science at St John's College, Durham University. Anna is a graduate of Geology from Royal Holloway University of London. Elizabeth's father, Robert, is a retired Church of England priest who often attends his son-in-law's previous parish church at Wimborne Minster.

Styles
The Reverend John Holbrook (1986–2006)
The Reverend Canon John Holbrook (2006–2011)
The Right Reverend John Holbrook (2011–present)

References

1962 births
21st-century Church of England bishops
Alumni of St Peter's College, Oxford
Bishops of Brixworth
Living people